Pristimantis gutturalis is a species of frog in the family Strabomantidae. It is found in Brazil, French Guiana, and Suriname.
Its natural habitat is tropical moist lowland forest.
It is threatened by habitat loss.

References

gutturalis
Amphibians described in 1977
Amphibians of Brazil
Amphibians of French Guiana
Amphibians of Suriname
Taxonomy articles created by Polbot